Napoléon Bourassa (October 21, 1827 – August 27, 1916) was a prominent Canadian architect, painter and writer whose offices were located in Montreal, Quebec.

Early life and training
Born in L'Acadie, Quebec, he studied at Sulpician College in Montreal. In 1848, he interned with Norbert Dumas in preparation for a legal career, but then chose to become a painter and studied with Theophile Hamel from 1850 to 1852.

He continued his education by visiting Paris, Rome and Florence accompanied by the German painter Johann Friedrich Overbeck, a member of the Nazarene movement. After this he established his art studio in Montebello.

Practice
Bourassa founded and directed the Canadian Journal and became vice-president of the Saint-Jean-Baptiste Society. He resided on 430 Rue Bonsecours Montreal. Bourassa had several associates who became famous, including Louis-Philippe Hébert, François-Édouard Meloche and Olindo Gratton. He also sculpted the bust of his father-in-law Louis-Joseph Papineau.

He designed the "Chapelle Notre-Dame de Lourdes de Montréal" and the "Institut Nazareth et Louis Braille". One of his most familiar paintings is The Apotheosis of Christopher Columbus.

In 1877, he was a member of a commission of inquiry of the government of Quebec and went to France to study the organization, the functioning and the teaching methods of the schools of arts and crafts and the schools of drawing applied to industry, architecture and mechanics.

In 1880, he founded the National Gallery of Canada with his fellow artists. He consulted in 1883 for the construction of a building to house the Legislative Assembly of Quebec.

He died August 27, 1916, in Lachenaie. His daughter Adine published his correspondence in 1929. The "Fund-Napoleon Bourassa" was created in his honor at the University of Ottawa. His works were exhibited at Galerie L'Art français

Family
Napoléon Bourassa was married to Azélie Papineau, the daughter of the Quebec politician Louis-Joseph Papineau. One of his sons was Henri Bourassa, a journalist and the founder of the newspaper Le Devoir.

Works include

 Dominican convent of Saint-Hyacinthe
 Chapel of the Ladies of Sacred Heart
 Chapelle Notre Dame de Lourdes de Montréal
 Chapelle du Manoir Louis-Joseph Papienau
 Church of Montebello, Quebec
 St. Anne Shrine Church, Fall River, Massachusetts USA
 Church of Saint-Hugues
 Church of Saint-Ours
 Renovation of the Saint Hyacinthe the Confessor Cathedral of Saint-Hyacinthe, Quebec

Honours 
 Royal Canadian Academy of Arts

References

Further reading
 Vézina, Raymond. Napoléon Bourassa (1827-1916): 60th Anniversary.... The exhibition and [this] catalogue were prepared by Raymond Vézina. [Ottawa, Ont.]: Public Archives Canada, 1976. Title also in French; texts printed, tête-bêche, in English and French. Without ISBN

External links
 
Historic Places of Canada

1827 births
1916 deaths
Canadian architects
Canadian ecclesiastical architects
Architects of Roman Catholic churches
Architects from Quebec
French Quebecers
Museum founders
People from Montérégie
Architects of cathedrals
19th-century philanthropists